Stuart's salamander (Bolitoglossa stuarti) is a species of salamander in the family Plethodontidae, found in Guatemala and Mexico. Its natural habitats are subtropical or tropical dry forests and subtropical or tropical moist montane forests. This salamander is threatened by habitat loss.

References

Bolitoglossa
Taxonomy articles created by Polbot
Amphibians described in 1969